State Route 245 (SR 245) is a primary state highway in the U.S. state of Virginia. Known for most of its length as Old Tavern Road, the state highway runs  from U.S. Route 17 (US 17) at Old Tavern north to SR 55 in The Plains in northern Fauquier County.

SR 245 is a Virginia Byway.

Route description

SR 245 begins at an intersection with US 17 at the hamlet of Old Tavern; the U.S. Highway heads south toward Warrenton as James Madison Highway and northwest toward Winchester as Winchester Road. The state highway heads northeast as two-lane undivided Old Tavern Road through farmland, within which it crosses Piney Branch of Broad Run. SR 245 meets Interstate 66 at a diamond interchange south of the town of The Plains. The state highway enters town as Fauquier Avenue and reaches its northern terminus at SR 55 (Main Street).

Major intersections

References

External links

Virginia Highways Project: VA 245

245
State Route 245
245